The Billboard Dance/Electronic Songs chart ranks the most popular dance and electronic song combining airplay audience impressions, digital downloads, streaming and club play. The chart was introduced by Billboard in January 2013 as a result of the rise in popularity of the genres. The chart is published weekly and songs are ranked according to airplay impressions and volume of streams, sales and club spins, and tracked by Nielsen SoundScan, Nielsen BDS, BDS from streaming services including Spotify and Xbox Music, and from a United States-wide select panel of 140 DJs.

Multiple artists have achieved more than three number ones on the chart, including Calvin Harris and Zedd with three apiece and The Chainsmokers with six. Similarly, three songs have spent more than 20 weeks atop the chart: "Lean On" by Major Lazer and DJ Snake featuring MØ spent 23 weeks at number one in 2015–16, "Wake Me Up" by Avicii in 2013–14, which held the record of 26 weeks until it was eclipsed by one week by "Closer" by The Chainsmokers featuring Halsey in February 2017. "Harlem Shake" by Baauer was declared the most popular song of 2013 on the year-end chart, which was followed by "Turn Down for What" by DJ Snake and Lil Jon in 2014, "Lean On" in 2015 and "Don't Let Me Down" by The Chainsmokers in 2016.

The first number-one song published in the chart issue dated January 26, 2013, was "Scream & Shout" by will.i.am and Britney Spears, a position it held for 5 consecutive weeks. "Happier" by Marshmello and Bastille holds the record for the longest streak of holding number-one position for 69 weeks. As of the issue dated March 18, 2023, "I'm Good (Blue)" by David Guetta and Bebe Rexha is the current number one.

Number ones

References

United States Dance Electronic Songs
United States Dance Electronic Songs